The YUBA League was the top-tier men's professional basketball league in Serbia and Montenegro (previously FR Yugoslavia). Founded in 1992 and folded in 2006, it was run by the Basketball Federation of Serbia and Montenegro.

The name YUBA League (Yugoslav Basketball Association League) was used in Serbia and Montenegro until 2005. It consisted of the first-stage "First League", and the second-stage "Super League", with each having their own men's and women's divisions. The league was also named YUBA League: Sportstar YUBA League, Winston YUBA League, Frikom YUBA League, Efes Pils YUBA League, Atlas Pils YUBA League, and Sinalco First League, for sponsorship reasons. For past league sponsorship names, see the list below.

When Serbia and Montenegro peacefully separated in 2006, the YUBA League ceased to exist and was re-branded as the Basketball League of Serbia a Serbia-only organization, with Montenegro forming its own federation.

Rules

Competition format 2003–2006
Both the Super League and First League used a double round-robin style qualification round, where each team played every other team both at home and away. Even the quarters, semis, and finals were played at home and away, including a tie-breaker if necessary with the home advantage awarded to the better qualifying team.

The Super League men's contained eight clubs, while women's contained six. Immediately after the qualification round were the semi finals, in which the top four qualifying teams competed in. While the two leagues worked exactly the same, the First League however, contained almost twice as many clubs as the Super League, fourteen and twelve for men's and women's respectively and therefore included quarter finals.

History

Championship history

Sponsorship naming 
The League has had several denominations through the years due to its sponsorship: 
 Sportstar YUBA League: 1995–1996
 Winston YUBA League: 1996–2002
 Frikom YUBA League: 2002–2003
 Efes Pils YUBA League: 2003–2004
 Atlas Pils YUBA League: 2004–2005
 Sinalco First League: 2005–2006

Champions 
 1992–93 Crvena zvezda
 1993–94 Crvena zvezda
 1994–95 Partizan
 1995–96 Partizan
 1996–97 Partizan
 1997–98 Crvena zvezda
 1998–99 Budućnost
 1999–00 Budućnost
 2000–01 Budućnost
 2001–02 Partizan ICN
 2002–03 Partizan Mobtel
 2003–04 Partizan Mobtel
 2004–05 Partizan Pivara MB 
 2005–06 Partizan Pivara MB

Performance by club

Play-off finals
Source

Following national leagues 
  Basketball League of Serbia (2006–present)
  Kosovo Basketball Superleague
  Montenegrin Basketball League  (2006–present)

Yugoslav Super Cup

See also
 Yugoslav First Basketball League
 Yugoslav Basketball Cup
 Adriatic League

References

Defunct basketball leagues in Europe
Basketball leagues in Serbia and Montenegro
Sports leagues established in 1992
Sports leagues disestablished in 2006
1992 establishments in Yugoslavia
2006 disestablishments in Serbia and Montenegro